Lake Sulluscocha (possibly from Quechua sullu fetus/lock made of wood, qucha lake) is a lake in Peru located in the Cajamarca Region, Cajamarca Province, Llacanora District. This is a place to watch birds.

References 

Lakes of Cajamarca Region
Lakes of Peru